Five Nights at Freddy's 3 is a survival horror video game developed and published by Scott Cawthon. It is the third installment in the Five Nights at Freddy's series, and chronologically takes place thirty years after the events of the first game, in a horror-themed attraction based on the chain of restaurants featured in the first two games. The player takes on the role of a security guard who must defend themselves from a decrepit animatronic called Springtrap that roams the attraction.  

Cawthon first teased a third Five Nights at Freddy's installment on his website in January 2015. The game was released on Steam on March 2, 2015, for Android devices on March 6, 2015, and for iOS devices on March 12, 2015. Nintendo Switch, PlayStation 4 and Xbox One ports were released on November 29, 2019.

The game received generally positive reviews from critics for its mechanics despite being criticized for its lackluster jumpscares and for lacking the charm of its predecessors. The fourth game in the series, Five Nights at Freddy's 4, was released on July 23, 2015, while a chronological sequel, Freddy Fazbear's Pizzeria Simulator, was released on December 4, 2017.

Gameplay

The gameplay deviates from the previous games of the series slightly. In keeping with the first two installments, players are tasked with surviving night shifts as a security guard, with each night lasting from 12 a.m. to 6 a.m. (about 6 minutes of real time). However, unlike the previous two games, only one animatronic is able to attack the player and end the game. Several animatronics from earlier games return as "phantoms" that cannot harm the player directly, but can hinder their efforts to survive the night. 

The game takes place in a horror-themed attraction called "Fazbear's Fright" through which a single animatronic called "Springtrap" roams. The player must monitor two separate security camera systems, one for the rooms and corridors throughout the facility, and one for the ventilation ductwork, in order to track Springtrap's movements. They can seal off the air vents at certain points to block Springtrap's progress towards the office, but the door or air vent that leads directly into the office remains permanently open. In addition to observing the camera systems, the player must watch the status of three operating systems and reboot them whenever they malfunction. These systems control the cameras, a set of audio devices that can be used to lure Springtrap away from the player's position, and the facility's ventilation. The camera and audio systems malfunction after prolonged or repeated usage. The ventilation system fails at random, or when a "phantom" animatronic jumpscares the player. Some of these animatronics can also cause audio and camera failure; for instance "Phantom Mangle" can affect audio as well as ventilation. Failure to keep the latter running can cause the player to momentarily lose vision as well as hallucinate and see multiple animatronics in the building. If Springtrap enters the office, he jumpscares the player and the game ends.

The game consists of five nights, increasing in difficulty, and completing all five unlocks an even more challenging "Nightmare" night. Going through the game normally grants a star at the fifth night. Several Atari-style minigames are also playable within the main game; completing all of them unlocks the game's "good ending" and grants access to bonus content as well as a second star. If the player completes the "Nightmare" night, they will unlock the cheat menu and a third star. The cheat menu offers a range of options, including a mode to make the animatronics more aggressive and increase the game's difficulty. Other cheats include a radar to track Springtrap and the ability to decrease the length of nights. Completing the "Nightmare" night with only the aggressive cheat enabled grants the fourth star.

Plot

The player assumes the role of a newly-hired employee at Fazbear's Fright, a horror-themed attraction inspired by Freddy Fazbear's Pizza, the family restaurant that closed thirty years prior. During the week before the attraction's official opening, the employee must watch over the facility from a security office each night from 12 a.m. to 6 a.m., using a network of surveillance cameras placed in rooms and air vents. They must monitor the status of three operating systems – cameras, audio, and ventilation – and reboot them whenever they begin to malfunction. Camera problems cause the camera feeds to become obscured by static, and if ventilation fails, the employee's vision begins to blackout. Due to the lack of air, the employee may also see hallucinatory "phantom" animatronics that resemble animatronics from the restaurant franchise, which can cause system malfunctions, but cannot directly harm the player.

On the second night, the staff at Fazbear's Fright uncovers an older, deteriorated, rabbit-like animatronic named Springtrap; the employee must thereafter prevent it from entering the office and killing them. The team also found a series of instructional cassette tapes, recorded by Phone Guy from the first game. The second night's tape instructs employees on how to operate springlock suits, which can function as both an animatronic and a costume for humans. The third night's tape discusses a "safe room", an additional emergency room which "is not included in the digital map layouts programmed in the animatronics or the security system. This room is hidden to customers, invisible to animatronics, and is always off-camera".

However, recordings on later nights discourage the use of the suits. The recording on the fourth night states the suits are no longer considered suitable for employees following "an unfortunate incident at the sister location involving multiple and simultaneous springlock failures." To replace the faulty suits, the recording states that temporary costumes would be provided, although questions about their appropriateness should be avoided. The recording which plays during the fifth night reminds employees that the safe room is for employees only, and that customers should never be taken there. Also, after discovering that one of the special suits was "noticeably moved," it reminds employees that the suits are considered unsafe to wear. 

Atari-style minigames that are playable between nights provide insight into the restaurant's lore. The first four nights' minigames depict animatronics from the previous two games following a dark purple animatronic before being violently disassembled by a purple figure, a supposed serial killer that was previously seen in the minigames of Five Nights at Freddy's 2. In the fifth night's minigame, the ghosts of the figure's victims corner him, and he seeks protection by hiding inside a yellow suit. However, the suit's springlock mechanism fails, crushing the man in the process, and the children fade away, leaving the figure to seemingly bleed to death. It is implied that the suit is now possessed by the spirit of the figure, which became Springtrap. 

Unlike the previous games, Five Nights at Freddy's 3 contains two endings, depending on whether the player has found and completed all of the hidden minigames within the main game. Some of these are only available on specific nights, while others can be accessed during any night. The "bad ending" is attained by completing the game without completing all the hidden minigames and shows a screen depicting the heads of four of the five animatronics from the first game with lit-up eyes, along with one head that is obscured by darkness where only the glowing eyes are visible, speculated to be Golden Freddy's head. Completing all the hidden minigames before completing the game earns the "good ending", which is the same screen as described previously but with the animatronics' eyes not lit up, and with the one obscured head missing. This screen has been speculated to suggest the souls of children killed by the purple figure and possessing the restaurant's animatronics have been put to rest.

In the sixth "Nightmare" night, an archived recording states that all Freddy Fazbear's Pizza locations' safe rooms will be permanently sealed, instructing employees that they are "not to be mentioned to family, friends or insurance representatives". When the night is completed, a newspaper clipping reveals that Fazbear's Fright was destroyed in a fire shortly after the events of the game and that any salvageable items from the attraction are to be auctioned off. However, brightening the image reveals Springtrap in the background, implying its survival.

Development
In January 2015, a new image was uploaded to Scott Cawthon's website, teasing a third entry in the series. A short while later, a second image was released, depicting the redesigned animatronics from the second game apparently scrapped. Various teaser images followed, before a trailer was released on January 26, 2015. The game was posted (and later accepted) onto Steam Greenlight the same day.

A demo for the game was released to selected YouTubers on March 1, 2015, with the full game being released hours later on March 2, 2015. On March 6, 2015, a mobile port was released for Android devices, and for iOS on March 12, 2015. Ports for Nintendo Switch, PlayStation 4 and Xbox One were released on November 29, 2019.

Reception 

Five Nights at Freddy's 3 received "mixed or average" reviews according to review aggregator Metacritic, assigning the Windows version a score of 68 out of 100.

Omri Petitte from PC Gamer gave Five Nights at Freddy's 3 a score of 77 out of 100, praising the reworked camera system and Springtrap, but commenting on how the jumpscares from the other animatronics "felt a little stale by the third night." In a more critical review, Nic Rowen from Destructoid gave the game a 6.5 out of 10, stating that although he saw the game as "by far the most technically proficient and mechanically satisfying installment yet," he disliked Springtrap and Fazbear's Fright for lacking the "charm of the original cast and locations."

References

External links

 
 Five Nights at Freddy's 3 on IndieDB

2015 video games
Android (operating system) games
3
Indie video games
IOS games
Point-and-click adventure games
Video games about robots
Single-player video games
Works about missing people
Video game sequels
Video games developed in the United States
Video games with alternate endings
Windows games
PlayStation 4 games
Nintendo Switch games
Xbox Cloud Gaming games
Xbox One games
Clickteam Fusion games
2010s horror video games